The Squaw Creek Bridge was located in Harrison Township in rural Boone County, Iowa, United States. The Boone County Board of Supervisors awarded a contract to the N.E. Marsh & Son Construction Company of Des Moines in August 1917 for $6,278. Designed by Des Moines engineer James B. Marsh, the Marsh arch bridge was completed the same year. The bridge was listed on the National Register of Historic Places (NRHP) in 1998. It has subsequently been replaced by a new span. The bridge was removed form the NRHP in 2022.

References

Bridges completed in 1917
Bridges in Boone County, Iowa
Arch bridges in Iowa
Road bridges on the National Register of Historic Places in Iowa
National Register of Historic Places in Boone County, Iowa
Former National Register of Historic Places in Iowa